Pseudancistrus pectegenitor is a species of catfish in the family Loricariidae. It is native to South America, where it occurs in the main channel of the Orinoco near the mouth of the Ventuari River, as well as in the Casiquiare. The species is usually found in areas with flowing water near large rocky outcrops. It reaches 24.2 cm (9.5 inches) SL.

P. pectegenitor was described in 2007 by Nathan K. Lujan (of the American Museum of Natural History), Mark H. Sabaj Pérez (of the Academy of Natural Sciences of Drexel University), and Jonathan W. Armbruster (of Auburn University) alongside another Pseudancistrus species, P. yekuana. Its specific epithet, pectegenitor, is derived from Latin and translates to "quilled father", alluding both to the species' quilled appearance (caused by its pectoral spines, eversible cheek plates, and hypertrophied snout odontodes) and the parental care exhibited by the species, as a presumably-adult male was apparently collected while caring for a large brood of young.

P. pectegenitor occasionally appears in the aquarium trade, where it is often referred to either as the longspined stream pleco or by its associated L-number, which is L-261.

References 

Ancistrini
Fish of Venezuela